In Burmese, classifiers or measure words, in the form of particles, are used when counting or measuring nouns. They immediately follow the number, unless the number is a round number (ends in a zero), in which case, the measure word precedes the number. Nouns to which the classifiers refer to can be omitted if the context allows, because many classifiers have implicit meanings.

The only exceptions to this rule are measurements of time or age (minutes, hours, days, years, etc.), where a preceding noun is not required, as the time measurement acts as a measure word.

Classifiers
See IPA/Burmese for an explanation of the phonetic symbols used in this section.

See also

Burmese units of measurement
Burmese language
Burmese numerals
Measure word

Numerical Classifiers
Lists of words
Numerical Classifiers